Eugen Beza (born 1 July 1978) is a Romanian former professional footballer who played for teams such as Inter Sibiu, Minaur Zlatna, FC Sibiu, Forex Brașov or Voința Sibiu, among others. He is currently the manager of CSC 1599 Șelimbăr.

Honours

Player
Minaur Zlatna
Divizia C: 2000–01

Apulum Alba Iulia
Liga II: 2002–03

FC Sibiu
Divizia C: 2003–04

Voința Sibiu
Liga III: 2009–10

Măgura Cisnădie
Liga IV – Sibiu County: 2013–14

Coach
FC Hermannstadt
Liga III: 2016–17

References

External links
 
 

1978 births
Living people
Sportspeople from Sibiu
Romanian footballers
Association football midfielders
CSM Unirea Alba Iulia players
CS Otopeni players
FC SKA-Khabarovsk players
CSU Voința Sibiu players
Romanian expatriate footballers
Expatriate footballers in Russia
Romanian expatriate sportspeople in Russia
Romanian football managers
FC Hermannstadt managers
CSC 1599 Șelimbăr managers